Edward or Ed Cunningham may refer to:

Edward Francis Cunningham (c. 1742–1795), Scottish painter
Edward Sheldon Cunningham (1859–1957), Australian newspaper editor
Edward Cunningham (cricketer) (born 1962), English cricketer
Eddie Cunningham, rugby player
Ed Cunningham (born 1969), American sports announcer and former American football player
Ed Cunningham (executive), American lawyer and CEO
Ed Cunningham, character in the 7 Faces of Dr. Lao
Ted Cunningham (born 1937), Australian politician